WALY (103.9 FM, "WALY 103.9") is an American radio station serving the Altoona, Pennsylvania, area. The station is owned by Seven Mountains Media. currently playing an adult contemporary format.

History
The station began playing a format of Top 40 and middle of the road music in its early days, first signing on as WHGM on March 28, 1970, more than three and a half years after the construction permit had been issued in the spring of 1966.

WHGM was originally owned by John Powley, whose interests were primarily in television.  Powley owned a financial stake in KHFI AM-FM-TV in Austin, Texas and would sign on an ABC-TV affiliate in Altoona six years later, known as WOPC-TV.

On New Year's Eve of 1986, the station was sold to Mid-Atlantic Radio, Inc., a company headed by Gregory Guise.  The sale happened about ten months after Powley had sold the license of his television station, which had been silenced due to financial problems.  The format was then changed to adult contemporary and the station moved from its transmitter location atop Wopsononock Mountain in Dysart to downtown Altoona.  The following March 9, 1987, the call letters were changed to WALY, which are still used today. WALY was later used on a Local Access Channel in the early 90s.

The station was sold again to S&P Broadcasting in February 1989 for $1 million, and then to its current owner, then known as Forever Broadcasting, Inc. in 1997.

Founder John Powley died in 2008.

It was announced on October 12, 2022 that Forever Media is selling 34 stations, including WALY and the entire Altoona cluster, to State College-based Seven Mountains Media for $17.3 million. The deal closed on January 2, 2023.

Sister stations
The sister stations of WALY in the Altoona market are 98.1 WFGY, 100.1 WWOT, 104.9 WRKY-FM, 1290 WFBG, and 1430 WTNA.

References

External links

ALY
Mainstream adult contemporary radio stations in the United States